The Podolsk constituency (No.124) is a Russian legislative constituency in Moscow Oblast. The constituency covers southern suburbs of Moscow. Until 2007 the constituency stretched from Podolsk westwards to Troitsk and Naro-Fominsk, however, Moscow expanded into Moscow Oblast in 2012, taking a large area as New Moscow (which now is a part of New Moscow constituency). To counter the territory loss Podolsk constituency was stretched to Domodedovo (formerly part of Serpukhov constituency) and Vidnoye (Odintsovo constituency).

Members elected

Election results

1993

|-
! colspan=2 style="background-color:#E9E9E9;text-align:left;vertical-align:top;" |Candidate
! style="background-color:#E9E9E9;text-align:left;vertical-align:top;" |Party
! style="background-color:#E9E9E9;text-align:right;" |Votes
! style="background-color:#E9E9E9;text-align:right;" |%
|-
|style="background-color:"|
|align=left|Grigory Bondarev
|align=left|Yavlinsky–Boldyrev–Lukin
|
|9.79%
|-
|style="background-color:#EA3C38"|
|align=left|Georgy Tikhonov
|align=left|Civic Union
| -
|8.80%
|-
| colspan="5" style="background-color:#E9E9E9;"|
|- style="font-weight:bold"
| colspan="3" style="text-align:left;" | Total
| 
| 100%
|-
| colspan="5" style="background-color:#E9E9E9;"|
|- style="font-weight:bold"
| colspan="4" |Source:
|
|}

1995

|-
! colspan=2 style="background-color:#E9E9E9;text-align:left;vertical-align:top;" |Candidate
! style="background-color:#E9E9E9;text-align:left;vertical-align:top;" |Party
! style="background-color:#E9E9E9;text-align:right;" |Votes
! style="background-color:#E9E9E9;text-align:right;" |%
|-
|style="background-color:"|
|align=left|Yury Voronin
|align=left|Communist Party
|
|15.98%
|-
|style="background-color:"|
|align=left|Grigory Bondarev (incumbent)
|align=left|Yabloko
|
|10.18%
|-
|style="background-color:"|
|align=left|Igor Kuznetsov
|align=left|Independent
|
|8.17%
|-
|style="background-color:"|
|align=left|Aleksey Averochkin
|align=left|Independent
|
|6.66%
|-
|style="background-color:"|
|align=left|Ivan Fedik
|align=left|Our Home – Russia
|
|5.83%
|-
|style="background-color:"|
|align=left|Lyudmila Krasnenkova
|align=left|Independent
|
|5.83%
|-
|style="background-color:#3A46CE"|
|align=left|Anatoly Shabad
|align=left|Democratic Choice of Russia – United Democrats
|
|5.80%
|-
|style="background-color:#2C299A"|
|align=left|Tatyana Lebedeva
|align=left|Congress of Russian Communities
|
|4.00%
|-
|style="background-color:"|
|align=left|Igor Klochkov
|align=left|Agrarian Party
|
|3.95%
|-
|style="background-color:#FF4400"|
|align=left|Gennady Fyodorov
|align=left|Party of Workers' Self-Government
|
|3.89%
|-
|style="background-color:"|
|align=left|Vladimir Shcheglov
|align=left|Liberal Democratic Party
|
|3.01%
|-
|style="background-color:"|
|align=left|Yury Levykin
|align=left|Independent
|
|2.87%
|-
|style="background-color:#D50000"|
|align=left|Leonid Zhuravlev
|align=left|Communists and Working Russia - for the Soviet Union
|
|2.77%
|-
|style="background-color:#F21A29"|
|align=left|Vladimir Menshov
|align=left|Trade Unions and Industrialists – Union of Labour
|
|2.63%
|-
|style="background-color:"|
|align=left|Lyudmila Chemeris
|align=left|Independent
|
|1.40%
|-
|style="background-color:"|
|align=left|Viktor Morozov
|align=left|Union of Patriots
|
|1.37%
|-
|style="background-color:"|
|align=left|Vladimir Melikhov
|align=left|Independent
|
|1.17%
|-
|style="background-color:#000000"|
|colspan=2 |against all
|
|11.16%
|-
| colspan="5" style="background-color:#E9E9E9;"|
|- style="font-weight:bold"
| colspan="3" style="text-align:left;" | Total
| 
| 100%
|-
| colspan="5" style="background-color:#E9E9E9;"|
|- style="font-weight:bold"
| colspan="4" |Source:
|
|}

1999

|-
! colspan=2 style="background-color:#E9E9E9;text-align:left;vertical-align:top;" |Candidate
! style="background-color:#E9E9E9;text-align:left;vertical-align:top;" |Party
! style="background-color:#E9E9E9;text-align:right;" |Votes
! style="background-color:#E9E9E9;text-align:right;" |%
|-
|style="background-color:#3B9EDF"|
|align=left|Maksim Vasilyev
|align=left|Fatherland – All Russia
|
|20.83%
|-
|style="background-color:"|
|align=left|Yury Voronin (incumbent)
|align=left|Communist Party
|
|18.18%
|-
|style="background-color:"|
|align=left|Grigory Bondarev
|align=left|Yabloko
|
|12.21%
|-
|style="background-color:"|
|align=left|Vladimir Smolensky
|align=left|Independent
|
|7.67%
|-
|style="background-color:"|
|align=left|Oleg Baklanov
|align=left|Independent
|
|5.66%
|-
|style="background-color:#C21022"|
|align=left|Aleksandr Lukashov
|align=left|Party of Pensioners
|
|5.31%
|-
|style="background-color:"|
|align=left|Igor Klyuyev
|align=left|Liberal Democratic Party
|
|2.60%
|-
|style="background-color:"|
|align=left|Valery Savin
|align=left|Independent
|
|2.48%
|-
|style="background-color:#FCCA19"|
|align=left|Yury Levykin
|align=left|Congress of Russian Communities-Yury Boldyrev Movement
|
|1.93%
|-
|style="background-color:#020266"|
|align=left|Nikolay Yumanov
|align=left|Russian Socialist Party
|
|1.15%
|-
|style="background-color:#084284"|
|align=left|Yevgeny Borkov
|align=left|Spiritual Heritage
|
|0.85%
|-
|style="background-color:"|
|align=left|Gennady Mironov
|align=left|Independent
|
|0.76%
|-
|style="background-color:#000000"|
|colspan=2 |against all
|
|17.67%
|-
| colspan="5" style="background-color:#E9E9E9;"|
|- style="font-weight:bold"
| colspan="3" style="text-align:left;" | Total
| 
| 100%
|-
| colspan="5" style="background-color:#E9E9E9;"|
|- style="font-weight:bold"
| colspan="4" |Source:
|
|}

2003

|-
! colspan=2 style="background-color:#E9E9E9;text-align:left;vertical-align:top;" |Candidate
! style="background-color:#E9E9E9;text-align:left;vertical-align:top;" |Party
! style="background-color:#E9E9E9;text-align:right;" |Votes
! style="background-color:#E9E9E9;text-align:right;" |%
|-
|style="background-color:"|
|align=left|Sergey Glazyev
|align=left|Rodina
|
|55.43%
|-
|style="background-color:#1042A5"|
|align=left|Aleksandr Byalko
|align=left|Union of Right Forces
|
|7.85%
|-
|style="background-color:"|
|align=left|Grigory Bondarev
|align=left|Yabloko
|
|5.24%
|-
|style="background-color:#C21022"|
|align=left|Sergey Zhilkin
|align=left|Russian Pensioners' Party-Party of Social Justice
|
|3.06%
|-
|style="background-color:"|
|align=left|Yury Spirin
|align=left|Liberal Democratic Party
|
|2.82%
|-
|style="background-color:"|
|align=left|Yury Baslakovsky
|align=left|Independent
|
|1.48%
|-
|style="background-color:#00A1FF"|
|align=left|Aleksandr Adamovich
|align=left|Party of Russia's Rebirth-Russian Party of Life
|
|1.47%
|-
|style="background-color:#164C8C"|
|align=left|Valery Burkov
|align=left|United Russian Party Rus'
|
|1.18%
|-
|style="background-color:#14589F"|
|align=left|Kirill Pakhomov
|align=left|Development of Enterprise
|
|0.80%
|-
|style="background-color:#000000"|
|colspan=2 |against all
|
|19.28%
|-
| colspan="5" style="background-color:#E9E9E9;"|
|- style="font-weight:bold"
| colspan="3" style="text-align:left;" | Total
| 
| 100%
|-
| colspan="5" style="background-color:#E9E9E9;"|
|- style="font-weight:bold"
| colspan="4" |Source:
|
|}

2016

|-
! colspan=2 style="background-color:#E9E9E9;text-align:left;vertical-align:top;" |Candidate
! style="background-color:#E9E9E9;text-align:left;vertical-align:top;" |Party
! style="background-color:#E9E9E9;text-align:right;" |Votes
! style="background-color:#E9E9E9;text-align:right;" |%
|-
|style="background-color: " |
|align=left|Vyacheslav Fetisov
|align=left|United Russia
|
|52.86%
|-
|style="background-color:"|
|align=left|Irina Tyutkova
|align=left|Communist Party
|
|11.87%
|-
|style="background-color:"|
|align=left|Fuad Sultanov
|align=left|Liberal Democratic Party
|
|7.18%
|-
|style="background-color:"|
|align=left|Sergey Kudinov
|align=left|A Just Russia
|
|6.79%
|-
|style="background-color:"|
|align=left|Sergey Korolev
|align=left|Rodina
|
|5.91%
|-
|style="background-color:"|
|align=left|Aleksandr Gunko
|align=left|Yabloko
|
|5.50%
|-
|style="background:"| 
|align=left|Boris Dvoynikov
|align=left|Communists of Russia
|
|3.99%
|-
|style="background:"| 
|align=left|Andrey Podmoskovny
|align=left|Patriots of Russia
|
|1.30%
|-
| colspan="5" style="background-color:#E9E9E9;"|
|- style="font-weight:bold"
| colspan="3" style="text-align:left;" | Total
| 
| 100%
|-
| colspan="5" style="background-color:#E9E9E9;"|
|- style="font-weight:bold"
| colspan="4" |Source:
|
|}

2021

|-
! colspan=2 style="background-color:#E9E9E9;text-align:left;vertical-align:top;" |Candidate
! style="background-color:#E9E9E9;text-align:left;vertical-align:top;" |Party
! style="background-color:#E9E9E9;text-align:right;" |Votes
! style="background-color:#E9E9E9;text-align:right;" |%
|-
|style="background-color:"|
|align=left|Vyacheslav Fetisov (incumbent)
|align=left|United Russia
|
|43.11%
|-
|style="background-color:"|
|align=left|Boris Ivanyuzhenkov
|align=left|Communist Party
|
|21.53%
|-
|style="background-color:"|
|align=left|Oleg Bondarenko
|align=left|A Just Russia — For Truth
|
|7.05%
|-
|style="background-color:"|
|align=left|German Bogatyrenko
|align=left|Liberal Democratic Party
|
|4.58%
|-
|style="background-color: " |
|align=left|Roman Kharlanov
|align=left|New People
|
|4.22%
|-
|style="background-color: "|
|align=left|Pavel Semyonov
|align=left|Party of Pensioners
|
|3.68%
|-
|style="background:"| 
|align=left|Denis Penkin
|align=left|Communists of Russia
|
|2.94%
|-
|style="background: "| 
|align=left|Irina Drozdova
|align=left|Yabloko
|
|2.77%
|-
|style="background-color:"|
|align=left|Tatyana Filippova
|align=left|The Greens
|
|2.37%
|-
|style="background-color:"|
|align=left|Stanislav Abramov
|align=left|Rodina
|
|1.79%
|-
|style="background:"| 
|align=left|Maya Moreva
|align=left|Party of Growth
|
|1.45%
|-
| colspan="5" style="background-color:#E9E9E9;"|
|- style="font-weight:bold"
| colspan="3" style="text-align:left;" | Total
| 
| 100%
|-
| colspan="5" style="background-color:#E9E9E9;"|
|- style="font-weight:bold"
| colspan="4" |Source:
|
|}

Notes

References

Russian legislative constituencies
Politics of Moscow Oblast